The 1988 Supertaça Cândido de Oliveira was the 10th edition of the Supertaça Cândido de Oliveira, the annual Portuguese football season-opening match contested by the winners of the previous season's top league and cup competitions (or cup runner-up in case the league- and cup-winning club is the same). The 1988 Supertaça Cândido de Oliveira was contested over two legs, and opposed Porto and Vitória de Guimarães of the Primeira Liga. Porto qualified for the SuperCup by winning the 1987–88 Primeira Divisão and the 1987–88 Taça de Portugal, whilst Vitória de Guimarães qualified for the Supertaça by being the cup-runner.

The first leg which took place at the Estádio D. Afonso Henriques, saw Vitória de Guimarães defeat Porto 2–0. The second leg which took place at the Estádio das Antas saw a 0–0 scoreline (2–0 on aggregate), which claimed the Vimaranenses a first Supertaça.

First leg

Details

Second leg

Details

References

Supertaça Cândido de Oliveira
1988–89 in Portuguese football
FC Porto matches
Vitória S.C. matches